Joseph Shaw (August 11, 1938 – December 19, 2005) was an American boxer. He competed in the men's light welterweight event at the 1956 Summer Olympics.

References

External links
 

1938 births
2005 deaths
American male boxers
Olympic boxers of the United States
Boxers at the 1956 Summer Olympics
Boxers from St. Louis
Light-welterweight boxers